Svetlana is a Russian ballad that was published in 1813.

Creation and publication history 

First published in the journal Vestnik Evropy, 1813, No. 1 and 2, with the subtitle: "To Al. An. Pr...va. " Dedicated to Zhukovsky's niece and student Aleksandra Andreevna Voeikova (who was the sister of the poet's muse M.A.Protasova-Moyer ), as a wedding gift to her.

The beginning of work on "Svetlana" dates back to 1808, the text was completed in 1812. In the well-known two-volume edition, as well as in the collection of selected works (all edited by A. D. Alferov), the edition of the Association of I. D. Sytin (Moscow, 1902), the ballad is attributed to the works of 1811.

The plot is based on Gottfried Bürger's ballad " Lenora". Zhukovsky addressed this plot three times: before Svetlana, he transcribed Lenora in the ballad Lyudmila, and later, in 1831, translated it more accurately under the author's title - but here the abduction of the bride by the dead is presented as a bad dream of a girl, and ballad has a happy ending.

Artistic originality 
It is written in trochee with alternating feet 4-3, and in long lines to compensate for the endings for men, and in short lines - for women. The stanza has 14 lines with the rhyming scheme abaBcFcFddEihE (thus, it closely resembles a sonnet, albeit much longer).

Svetlana is one of the most popular works of Russian romanticism, became one of the sources of the spread of the name Svetlana (before Zhukovsky it was found in Vostokov).

"Svetlana" is mentioned and quoted several times by Alexander Pushkin ("Eugene Onegin", chapter 3, stanza V; chapter 5, stanza X, epigraph to chapter 5; epigraph to the story " Snowstorm "). In his commentary on Eugene Onegin (Ch. III, V, 2-4), Vladimir Nabokov assesses the ballad as a "masterpiece" and suggests that Pushkin's "Onegin stanza" arose under the influence of this unusual sonnet stanza in Zhukovsky.

References 

Russian poems
1813 poems